The following is a list of transfers for 2016 Malaysian football. For the first transfer window, please see List of Malaysian football transfers 2016.

Malaysia Super League
The 2016 Malaysia Super League (also known as Liga Super Malaysia 2016) is the 13th season of the highest Malaysian football league since its inception in 2004. 12 teams participated in the league with Johor Darul Ta'zim as the defending champions.

The second transfer  window started on 20 June until on 17 July 2016.

Felda United

Transfers In

Transfers Out

Johor Darul Ta'zim

Transfers In

Transfers Out

Kedah FA

Transfers In

Transfers Out

Kelantan FA

Transfers In

Transfers Out

Pahang FA

Transfers In

Transfers Out

PDRM FA

Transfers In

Transfers Out

Penang FA

Transfers In

Transfers Out

Perak FA

Transfers In

Transfers Out

Sarawak FA

Transfers In

Transfers Out

Selangor FA

Transfers In

Transfers Out

Terengganu FA

Transfers In

Transfers Out

T-Team F.C.

Transfers In

Transfers Out

Malaysia Premier League
The 2016 Malaysia Premier League (Malaysian language: Liga Perdana Malaysia 2016) is the 13th season of the Malaysia Premier League since its inception in 2004. 12 teams participated in the league with Kedah as the reigning champions and currently play in the top flight of Malaysian football, Malaysia Super League.

The second transfer  window started on 20 June until on 17 July 2016.

ATM FA

Transfers In

Transfers Out

DRB-Hicom FC

Transfers In

Transfers Out

Johor Darul Ta'zim II

Transfers In

Transfers Out

Kuala Lumpur FA

Transfers In

Transfers Out

Kuantan FA

Transfers In

Transfers Out

Melaka United

Transfers In

Transfers Out

Negeri Sembilan FA

Transfers In

Transfers Out

Perlis FA

Transfers In

Transfers Out

PKNS FC

Transfers In

Transfers Out

Sabah FA

Transfers In

Transfers Out

Sime Darby FC

Transfers In

Transfers Out

UITM FC

Transfers In

Transfers Out

Malaysia FAM League
The 2016 Malaysia FAM League (referred to as the FAM League) is the 64th season of the FAM League since its establishment in 1952. The league is currently the third level football league in Malaysia. Malacca United S.A are the defending champions and currently play in the second level of Malaysian football, Malaysia Premier League.

The second transfer  window started on 28 April until on 31 May 2016.

AirAsia F.C.

Transfers In

Transfers Out

D.Y.S F.C.

Transfers In

Transfers Out

Felcra F.C.

Transfers In

Transfers Out

Hanelang F.C.

Transfers In

Transfers Out

KDM FC

Transfers In

Transfers Out

Ipoh FA

Transfers In

Transfers Out

Malaysia Malays F.C.

Transfers In

Transfers Out

Megah Murni F.C.

Transfers In

Transfers Out

MISC-MIFA

Transfers In

Transfers Out

MOF F.C.

Transfers In

Transfers Out

MPKB-BRI F.C.

Transfers In

Transfers Out

SAMB FC

Transfers In

Transfers Out

Penjara F.C.

Transfers In

Transfers Out

PKNP F.C.

Transfers In

Transfers Out

Sungai Ara F.C.

Transfers In

Transfers Out

UKM F.C.

Transfers In

Transfers Out

Shahzan Muda F.C.

Transfers In

Transfers Out

See also

 2016 Malaysia Super League
 2016 Malaysia Premier League
 2016 Malaysia FAM League
 2016 Malaysia FA Cup
 2016 Malaysia Cup
 2016 Malaysia President's Cup
 2016 Malaysia Youth League
 List of Malaysian football transfers 2016

References

2016
Tranfers
Malaysia